Whistlestop Park is a themed children's area with various rides at several Six Flags amusement parks.

History
Before being named Whistlestop Park, these themed areas were named Thomas Town from 2007 to 2010.
2006: On December 12, 2006, Six Flags released their plan for 2007. It detailed new corporate alliances with Thomas the Tank Engine, The Wiggles,  Evel Knievel and Tony Hawk, among several others.
2007: Six Flags Discovery Kingdom and Six Flags New England opened Thomas Town at their parks.
2008: Six Flags Magic Mountain and Six Flags Over Georgia opened Thomas Town at their parks.
2010: Six Flags America opened Thomas Town at their park. In late 2010, Six Flags began the process of removing licensed theming from attractions. They terminated licenses with Thomas the Tank Engine, The Wiggles, Tony Hawk, Evel Knievel, and Terminator. This resulted in all Thomas Town theming to be removed and rides to be renamed to suit the new Whistlestop Park theme. Six Flags Discovery Kingdom and Six Flags New England are the only parks that won't be transforming its Thomas Town to Whistlestop Park. Six Flags Discovery Kingdom themed area will be transformed to Seaside Junction. Six Flags New England removed their Thomas Town.
2011: The LA Times reported Six Flags Magic Mountain plans to unveil the re-branded Whistlestop Park kiddie area on March 19. All of the existing rides opened with new names and themes. Six Flags New England released a statement on Facebook stating The Thomas Town section of the park will be home to future expansion at Six Flags New England.
2012: Six Flags Over Georgia removed Whistlestop Train before the 2012 season but still operating Whistlestop Park's other attractions.
2013: Six Flags New England announced before the 2013 season that the park will be opening up Whistlestop Park after closing Thomas Town in late 2010. SFNE also unexpectedly added Flying Aces to the area replacing Harold the Helicopter and Bertie the Bus both of which did not reopen.
2015: Six Flags Over Georgia removed its last ride in Whistlestop Park in the fall of 2015, Whistlestop Park Playground. The playground was removed to moved to the new kids area of the park, Bugs Bunny Boomtown with a new name, Looney Tunes Adventure Camp. Whistlestop Park has been closed off.
2016: Six Flags New England unannouncedly removed Flying Aces before the beginning of the 2016 season leaving the New England Express as the sole operating attraction.
2019: Six Flags New England changed Whistlestop Park before the 2019 season to an all access area for Six Flags members service area. New England Express still operates. Sitting vacant for 4 years,  Six Flags Over Georgia rethemed the area as Screampunk District and added Pandemonium.

Attractions

Key
 Operating along with kids area
 No longer operating along with the kids area

See also
KIDZOPOLIS
 2011 in amusement parks
 2013 in amusement parks

References

External links 
 Six Flags America Kids Rides
 Six Flags Magic Mountain Kids Rides
 Six Flags New England

Themed areas in Six Flags amusement parks
Six Flags attractions
Six Flags America
Six Flags Magic Mountain
Six Flags New England
Six Flags Over Georgia
Amusement rides introduced in 2011
Amusement rides introduced in 2013
Amusement rides that closed in 2015